= K. maculata =

K. maculata may refer to:

- Karatausia maculata, a jewel beetle
- Kassina maculata, a running frog
